Áron Tamási (born: János Tamás; 20 September 1897 – 26 May 1966) was a Hungarian writer. He became well known in his native region of Transylvania and in Hungary for his stories written in his original Székely style.

Biography
Born to a Székely family in Farkaslaka in Udvarhely County (present-day Lupeni, Harghita County), he graduated in Law and Commerce at the Babeș-Bolyai University, Tamási emigrated to the United States in 1923, soon after Transylvania became part of Romania. He wrote his first Hungarian-language novels there, and these were soon published in Cluj, to widespread acclaim. He returned home in 1926 and lived in Transylvania until 1944.

One of Tamási's most famous works from this period was a novel trilogy about the adventures of a Székely boy called Ábel, a young forest ranger living alone in the Hargita Mountains. Tamási moved to Budapest in 1944, and lived there until his death in 1966. At his request, he was buried in his native Székely Land, an ethno-cultural region in eastern Transylvania, Romania.

Works 
 Szász Tamás, a pogány – Cluj, 1922 – short story
 Lélekindulás – Cluj, 1925 – short stories
 Szűzmáriás királyfi – 1928 – novel
 Erdélyi csillagok 1929 – short stories
 Címeresek – Cluj, 1931 – novel
 Helytelen világ – Cluj, 1931 –  short stories
 Ábel a rengetegben – Cluj, 1932 – novel
 Ábel az országban – Cluj, 1934 – novel
 Ábel Amerikában – Cluj,  1934 – novel
 Énekes madár – Budapest, 1934 – drama
 Rügyek és reménység – Budapest, 1935 – short stories
 Jégtörő Mátyás – Cluj, 1936 – novel
 Tündöklő Jeromos – Cluj, 1936 – drama
 Ragyog egy csillag – Cluj, 1937 – novel
 Virágveszedelem – Budapest, 1938 – short stories
 Magyari rózsafa – Budapest, 1941 – novel
 Vitéz lélek – Budapest, 1941 – drama 
 Csalóka szivárvány – Budapest, 1942 – drama
 Összes novellái – Budapest, 1942 – short stories
 A legényfa kivirágzik – Budapest, 1944 – short stories
 Hullámzó vőlegény – Budapest, 1947 – drama
 Zöld ág – Budapest, 1948 – novel
 Bölcső és bagoly – Budapest, 1953 – novel
 Hazai tükör – Budapest, 1953 – novel
 Elvadult paradicsom – Budapest, 1958 – short stories 1922–26
 Világ és holdvilág – Budapest, 1958 – short stories 1936–57
 Hegyi patak – 1959, drama
 Szirom és Boly – Budapest, 1960 – novel
 Játszi remény – Budapest, 1961 – short stories
 Akaratos népség – Budapest, 1962 – drama
 Hétszínű virág – Budapest, 1963 – short stories

External links

Digitalised works of Áron Tamási

1897 births
1966 deaths
People from Harghita County
People from the Kingdom of Hungary
Székely people
Romanian people of Hungarian descent
National Peasant Party (Hungary) politicians
Members of the National Assembly of Hungary (1945–1947)
Hungarian novelists
Hungarian-language writers
Romanian male novelists
Franz Joseph University alumni
Romanian emigrants to the United States
20th-century Romanian novelists
20th-century male writers
Baumgarten Prize winners